The GP Comune di Cornaredo is an elite women's professional one-day road bicycle race held in Italy and is currently rated by the UCI as a 1.2 race.

Past winners

References 

 
Cycle races in Italy
Women's road bicycle races
Recurring sporting events established in 2008
2008 establishments in Italy